"För kärlekens skull" is a song with springtime references, written by Kenneth Gärdestad and Ted Gärdestad, and originally recorded by Ted Gärdestad in 1993. This recording charted at Svensktoppen for nine weeks between 16 May-10 July 1993, peaking at second position. The song has also been recorded by Christer Sjögren (2003), Lotta Engberg 2005), Erik Linder (2009) and Helen Sjöholm.

References 

1993 singles
Lotta Engberg songs
Christer Sjögren songs
Ted Gärdestad songs
Songs written by Ted Gärdestad
1993 songs